Ostlegionen ("eastern legions"),  Ost-Bataillone ("eastern battalions"), Osttruppen ("eastern troops"), and Osteinheiten ("eastern units")  were units in the Army of Nazi Germany during World War II made up of personnel from the Soviet Union. They were a large part of the Wehrmacht foreign volunteers and conscripts.

Background

Some members of the Ostlegionen units were conscripted or coerced into serving; others volunteered. Many were former Soviet personnel, recruited from prisoner of war camps. Osttruppen were frequently stationed away from front lines and used for coastal defence or rear-area activities, such as security operations, thus freeing up regular German forces for front-line service. They belonged to two distinct types of units:
 Ost-Bataillone were composed of various nationalities, raised mostly amongst prisoners of war (POW) captured in Eastern Europe, who had been formed into battalion-sized units, which were integrated individually into German combat formations, and;
 Ostlegionen were larger foreign legion-type units raised amongst members of a specific ethnic minority or minorities, and comprising multiple battalions.

Members of Osteinheiten usually faced execution or harsh terms of imprisonment, if they were captured by Soviet forces or repatriated to the USSR by the western Allies.

Ost-Bataillone
Ost-Bataillone wore German uniforms and equipment and were integrated into larger German formations. They began as the private initiatives of individual military commanders. Most were utilized on the Eastern Front and in the Balkans.

In 1944, a number of Ost-Bataillone were stationed in northern France, in anticipation of an Allied invasion of Western Europe. Units that fought in Normandy against Allied Operation Overlord were part of the German 243rd and 709th Static Infantry Divisions, positioned in the vicinity of the Utah, Juno and Sword invasion beaches.  Ost-Bataillone were also present in southern France, during the Allied landings  codenamed Operation Dragoon (August 1944).

Ostlegionen

See also
Hiwi (volunteer)
German mistreatment of Soviet prisoners of war
Nazi racial theories

References

Bibliography

 Elizabeth M.F. Grasmeder, "Leaning on Legionnaires: Why Modern States Recruit Foreign Soldiers," International Security (July 2021), Vol 46 (No. 1), pp. 147–195.
 
 
 

Foreign volunteer units of the Wehrmacht
Collaboration with Nazi Germany‎